Spirembolus chilkatensis is a species of sheet weaver found in the United States. It was described by Chamberlin & Ivie in 1947.

References

Linyphiidae
Spiders of the United States
Spiders described in 1947